The E4U is a single-person road vehicle, produced by Hyundai.

Operation
It travels on a rotating front sphere and two rear training-wheel-type supports. Propulsion is controlled by foot pedals, which cause the spherical front to tilt. It comes with headgear that serves as the roof.

References 

Personal transporters
Vehicles introduced in 2013
South Korean inventions
Battery electric vehicles
Three-wheeled balancing robots
Mobility devices